The fultograph was an early, clockwork image-receiving device, similar in function to fax machines. It took signals from the loudspeaker socket of a radio receiver and used an electrochemical process to darken areas of sensitised paper wrapped on a rotating drum. Invented by Otho Fulton, the system was used briefly in the late 1920s to broadcast images to homes by radio. The machines themselves were expensive (£22 15s 0d in 1928) and required a good receiver to operate.

The BBC broadcast Fultograph images in 759 programmes between 1929 and 1932. The Fultograph was the subject of an article in the British RadCom amateur radio magazine in October 2007.

References

External links
 A detailed German text, from a 1920s catalogue, with illustrations and a circuit diagram.
 Fultograph, a German-language text with colour photographs.

Telecommunications equipment